Tungabhadra is a 2015 Indian Telugu-language romantic comedy-action film directed by Srinivasa Krishna and produced under Varahi Chalana Chitram banner. The film features Adith Arun and Dimple Chopade in the lead roles along with Sathyaraj, Charandeep and Ravi Varma in the key supporting roles. The film was released worldwide on 20 March 2015.

Plot

Cast
 Adith Arun as Sreenu
 Dimple Chopade as Gowri
 Charandeep as Thrimurtulu 
 Sathyaraj as Ramaraju
 Kota Srinivasa Rao as Paiditalli
 Ravi Varma
 Saptagiri
 Tammareddy Chalapathi Rao
 Pavitra Lokesh

Reception
The film had a low profile release and received negative reviews from APHerald.com, amongst other sites.

References

2010s Telugu-language films
2015 action drama films
2015 masala films
Indian action drama films

Vaaraahi Chalana Chitram films